Edgar Ætheling or Edgar II (c. 1052 – 1125 or after) was the last male member of the royal house of Cerdic of Wessex. He was elected King of England by the Witenagemot in 1066, but never crowned.

Family and early life

Edgar was born in the Kingdom of Hungary, where his father Edward the Exile, son of Edmund Ironside, had spent most of his life, having been sent into exile after Edmund's death and the conquest of England by the Danish king Cnut the Great in 1016. His grandfather Edmund, great-grandfather Æthelred the Unready, and great-great-grandfather Edgar the Peaceful were all kings of England before Cnut the Great took the crown. Edgar's mother was Agatha, who was described as a relative of the Holy Roman Emperor or a descendant of Saint Stephen of Hungary, but whose exact identity is unknown. He was his parents' only son but had two sisters, Margaret and Cristina.

In 1057, Edward the Exile arrived in England with his family, but died almost immediately. Edgar, a child, was left as the only surviving male member of the royal dynasty apart from the king. However, the latter made no recorded effort to entrench his great-nephew's position as heir to a throne that was being eyed by a range of powerful potential contenders, including England's leading aristocrat Harold Godwinson, Earl of Wessex, and the foreign rulers William II of Normandy, Sweyn II of Denmark and Harald III of Norway.

Succession struggle
When King Edward the Confessor died in January 1066, Edgar was still in his early teens, considered too young to be an effective military leader. This had not been an insurmountable obstacle in the succession of previous kings. However, the avaricious ambitions that had been aroused across north-western Europe by the Confessor's lack of an heir prior to 1057, and by the king's failure thereafter to prepare the way for Edgar to succeed him, removed any prospect of a peaceful hereditary succession. War was clearly inevitable and Edgar was in no position to fight it, while he was without powerful adult relatives to champion his cause. Accordingly, the Witenagemot elected Harold Godwinson, the man best placed to defend the country against the competing foreign claimants, to succeed Edward.

Following Harold's death at the Battle of Hastings against the invading Normans in October, some of the Anglo-Saxon leaders considered electing Edgar king. The new regime thus established was dominated by the most powerful surviving members of the English ruling class: Stigand, Archbishop of Canterbury, Ealdred, Archbishop of York, and the brothers Edwin, Earl of Mercia and Morcar, Earl of Northumbria. The commitment of these men to Edgar's cause, men who had so recently passed over his claim to the throne without apparent demur, must have been doubtful from the start. The strength of their resolve to continue the struggle against William of Normandy was questionable, and the military response they organised to the continuing Norman advance was ineffectual. When William crossed the Thames at Wallingford, he was met by Stigand, who now abandoned Edgar and submitted to the invader. As the Normans closed in on London, Edgar's key supporters in the city began negotiating with William. In early December, the remaining members of the Witan in London met and resolved to take the young uncrowned king out to meet William to submit to him at Berkhamsted, quietly setting aside Edgar's election. Edgar, alongside other lords, did homage to King William at his coronation in December.

Exile and war against the Normans
William kept Edgar in his custody and took him, along with other English leaders, to his court in Normandy in 1067, before returning with them to England. Edgar may have been involved in the abortive rebellion of the Earls Edwin and Morcar in 1068, or he may have been attempting to return to Hungary with his family and been blown off course; in any case, in that year he arrived with his mother and sisters at the court of King Malcolm III of Scotland. Malcolm married Edgar's sister Margaret, and agreed to support Edgar in his attempt to reclaim the English throne. When the rebellion that resulted in the Harrying of the North broke out in Northumbria at the beginning of 1069, Edgar returned to England with other rebels who had fled to Scotland, to become the leader, or at least the figurehead, of the revolt. However, after early successes the rebels were defeated by William at York and Edgar again sought refuge with Malcolm. In late summer that year, the arrival of a fleet sent by King Sweyn of Denmark triggered a fresh wave of English uprisings in various parts of the country. Edgar and the other exiles sailed to the Humber, where they linked up with Northumbrian rebels and the Danes. Their combined forces overwhelmed the Normans at York and took control of Northumbria, but a small seaborne raid which Edgar led into the Kingdom of Lindsey ended in disaster, and he escaped with only a handful of followers to rejoin the main army. Late in the year, William fought his way into Northumbria and occupied York, buying off the Danes and devastating the surrounding country. Early in 1070, he moved against Edgar and other English leaders who had taken refuge with their remaining followers in a marshy region, perhaps Holderness or the Isle of Ely, and put them to flight. Edgar returned to Scotland.

He remained there until 1072, when William invaded Scotland and forced King Malcolm to submit to his overlordship. The terms of the agreement between them included the expulsion of Edgar. He therefore took up residence in Flanders, whose count, Robert the Frisian, was hostile to the Normans. However, he was able to return to Scotland in 1074. Shortly after his arrival there, he received an offer from Philip I, King of France, who was also at odds with William, of a castle and lands near the borders of Normandy from where he would be able to raid his enemies' homeland. He embarked with his followers for France, but a storm wrecked their ships on the English coast. Many of Edgar's men were hunted down by the Normans, but he managed to escape with the remainder to Scotland by land. Following this disaster, he was persuaded by Malcolm to make peace with William and return to England as his subject, abandoning any ambition of regaining his ancestral throne.

Italian venture
Disappointed at the level of recompense and respect he received from William, in 1086 Edgar renounced his allegiance to the Conqueror and moved with a retinue of men to Norman Apulia. The Domesday Book, compiled that year, records Edgar's ownership of only two small estates (Barkway and Hermead) in Hertfordshire. This is probably because Edgar had given up his English properties when he left for Italy, not intending to return. In that case the recording of the Hertfordshire estates under his name is likely to be an anomaly, reflecting a situation which had recently ceased to apply. The venture in the Mediterranean was evidently not a success; within a few years Edgar returned to England.

Norman and Scottish dynastic strife
After King William's death in 1087, Edgar supported William's eldest son Robert Curthose, who succeeded him as Duke of Normandy, against his second son, William Rufus, who received the throne of England as William II. Edgar was one of Robert's three principal advisors at this time. The war waged by Robert and his allies to overthrow William ended in defeat in 1091. As part of the resulting settlement between the brothers, Edgar was deprived of lands which he had been granted by Robert. These were presumably former possessions of William and his supporters in Normandy, confiscated by Robert and distributed to his own followers, including Edgar, but restored to their previous owners by the terms of the peace agreement. The disgruntled Edgar travelled once again to Scotland, where Malcolm was preparing for war with William. When William marched north and the two armies confronted one another, the kings opted to talk rather than fight. The negotiations were conducted by Edgar on behalf of Malcolm, and the newly reconciled Robert Curthose on behalf of William. The resulting agreement included a reconciliation between William and Edgar. However, within months Robert left England, unhappy with William's failure to fulfil the pact between them, and Edgar went with him to Normandy.

Having returned to England, Edgar went to Scotland again in 1093, on a diplomatic mission for William to negotiate with Malcolm, who was dissatisfied with the Norman failure to implement in full the terms of the 1091 treaty. This dispute led to war, and within the year Malcolm had invaded England and had been killed along with his designated heir Edward, eldest of his sons by Margaret, in the Battle of Alnwick. Malcolm's successor, his brother Donald Bán, drove out the English and French retainers who had risen high in Malcolm's service and had thus aroused the jealousy of the existing Scottish aristocracy. This purge brought him into conflict with the Anglo-Norman monarchy, whose influence in Scotland had diminished. William helped Malcolm's eldest son Duncan, who had spent many years as a hostage at William I's court and remained there when set at liberty by William II, to overthrow his uncle, but Donald soon regained the throne and Duncan was killed. Another effort to restore the Anglo-Norman interest through sponsorship of Malcolm's sons was launched in 1097, and Edgar made yet another journey to Scotland, this time in command of an invading army. Donald was ousted, and Edgar installed his nephew and namesake, Malcolm and Margaret's son Edgar, on the Scottish throne.

First Crusade
According to Orderic, Edgar was the commander of an English fleet which operated off the coast of the region of Syria in support of the First Crusade, whose crews eventually burned their dilapidated ships and joined the advance by land to Jerusalem. This is doubtful, for this fleet is known to have arrived off the Syrian coast by March 1098; since Edgar invaded Scotland late in 1097, he could not have made the voyage in the time available. It may be though that he travelled overland to the Mediterranean and joined the fleet en route; this is the view taken by Runciman. William of Malmesbury recorded that Edgar made a pilgrimage to Jerusalem in 1102, and it may be that Orderic's report is the product of confusion, conflating the expedition of the English fleet with Edgar's later journey. Some modern historians have suggested that at some point during these years Edgar served in the Varangian Guard of the Byzantine Empire, a unit which was at that time composed primarily of English emigrants, but this is unsupported by evidence. William of Malmesbury stated that on his way back from Jerusalem Edgar was given rich gifts by both the Byzantine and the German emperors, each of whom offered him an honoured place at court, but that he insisted on returning home instead.

Later life
Back in Europe, Edgar again took the side of Robert Curthose in the internal struggles of the Norman dynasty, this time against Robert's youngest brother, who was now Henry I, King of England. He was taken prisoner in the final defeat at the Battle of Tinchebray in 1106, which resulted in Robert being imprisoned for the rest of his life. Edgar was more fortunate: having been taken back to England, he was pardoned and released by King Henry. His niece Edith (renamed Matilda), daughter of Malcolm III and Margaret, had married Henry in 1100. Edgar is believed to have travelled to Scotland once more late in life, perhaps around the year 1120. He lived to see the death at sea in November 1120 of William Adeling, the son of his niece Edith and heir to Henry I. Edgar was still alive in 1125, according to William of Malmesbury, who wrote at the time that Edgar "now grows old in the country in privacy and quiet". Edgar died some time after this contemporary reference, but the exact date and the location of his grave are not known.

According to a 1291 Huntingdon Priory Chronicle, Edgar had one child, Margaret Lovel, who was the wife of firstly Ralph Lovel II, of Castle Cary and secondly of Robert de Londres, both of whom had estates in southern Scotland. 

There are two references to an "Edgar Adeling" found in the Magnus Rotulus Pipae Northumberland (Pipe rolls) for the years 1158 and 1167. Historian Edward Freeman, writing in The History of the Norman Conquest of England, says that this was the same Edgar (aged over 100), a son of his, or some other person known by the title Ætheling.

Notes

References

External links
 Edgar Atheling at the official website of the British monarchy
 

Christians of the First Crusade
English Roman Catholics
Anglo-Saxon warriors
Heirs to the English throne
11th century in Scotland
1050s births
1120s deaths
Year of birth uncertain
Year of death uncertain
Pretenders to the English throne
11th-century English monarchs
12th-century English people
House of Wessex